Geoffrey Clark (born 8 February 1969) is an Australian water polo player who competed in the 1988 Summer Olympics and in the 1992 Summer Olympics.

Clark graduated from Pepperdine with a degree in sports medicine in 1993. He and his wife have three children and they reside in San Antonio, Texas.

See also
 Australia men's Olympic water polo team records and statistics
 List of men's Olympic water polo tournament top goalscorers

References

1969 births
Living people
Australian male water polo players
Olympic water polo players of Australia
Water polo players at the 1988 Summer Olympics
Water polo players at the 1992 Summer Olympics